Muhammet Jumanazaruly Kopeev (romanized: Mūhammet Jūmanazarūly Kopeev; born 15 November 1949) is a Kazakhstani politician who served as a member of the Senate of Kazakhstan from 29 November 2005 to 24 November 2011 and was its Deputy Chair. Prior to that, he was Minister of Emergency Situations from 30 September 2004 to 11 August 2005 and was a member of the Mazhilis from 1996 to 2004 where he was Mazhilis Deputy Chair from 1 December 1999 until 2004.

Biography

Early life and education 
Muhammet Kopeev was born to a Muslim Kazakh family in the village of Rudnik in Karaganda Region, Kazakhstan.  He is the son of Fariza and Jumanazar Kopeev.  In 1972, he graduated from the Satbayev University with a degree mining engineering. From 1983 to 1985, Kopeev attended the Alma-Ata Higher Party School where he earned degree in political science and then in 1998 from the Abai Kazakh National Pedagogical University where he specialized in law.

Career 
From 1973 to 1976, Kopeev was mining foreman, Secretary of the Komsomol Committee of the Dzhezkazgan Mining Trust. He then worked as a Secretary and First Secretary of the Nikolsk City Committee of the Leningrad Komsomol Committee until he became the instructor of the Dzhezkazgan Regional Party Committee in 1980. From 1985, Kopeev was the Second Secretary of the Dzhezdinsky District Party Committee. In 1986, he became the Chairman of the Qarajal City Executive Committee and from 1989, was the Head of Department of the Dzhezkazgan Regional Party Committee.

In 1991, Kopeev was appointed as the Chairman of the Administrative Council of the Jairem-Atasui Consolidated Economic Zone and was the Head of the Qarajal City Administration from 1992 until becoming a member of the Mazhilis in 1996 where he was member of the Finance and Budget Committee. On 1 December 1999, Kopeev was elected as the Mazhilis Deputy Chair where he served the post until he was appointed as Minister of Emergency Situations on 30 September 2004. 

On 29 November 2005, he was appointed as member of the Senate of Kazakhstan and from 1 December 2005 was its Deputy Chair until being dismissed as Senator on 24 November 2011.

References 

1949 births
Living people
People from Karaganda Region
Government ministers of Kazakhstan
Ministers of Emergency (Kazakhstan)
Members of the Mazhilis
Members of the Senate of Kazakhstan
20th-century Kazakhstani politicians
21st-century Kazakhstani politicians